The 2009 J. League Division 2 season was the 38th season of the second-tier club football in Japan and the 11th season since the establishment of J2 League.  The season started on March 7 and ended on December 5.

In this season, the number of participating clubs was increased by three, making the total number, eighteen.  The clubs played in triple round-robin format.  Starting this season, all top three clubs were promoted by default and Pro/Rele Series was eliminated accordingly.  There were no relegation to the third-tier Japan Football League.

General

Promotion and relegation
 Consadole Sapporo and Tokyo Verdy were relegated to J2
 Fagiano Okayama, Kataller Toyama and Tochigi SC were promoted from the JFL.

Changes in competition format
 Fourth foreign slot (AFC slot) has been created to each club's roster.
 Promotion/relegation Series had been eliminated to accommodate the 18-club J2; Division 2 club which finishes third place at the end of the season will receive automatic promotion to J1.

Changes in clubs 
none

Clubs 

Eighteen clubs played in J. League Division 2 during the 2009 season. Of these clubs, Consadole Sapporo and Tokyo Verdy were relegated from Division 1 last year.  Tochigi S.C., Kataller Toyama, and Fagiano Okayama newly joined from Japan Football League.

 Consadole Sapporo 
 Vegalta Sendai
 Mito HollyHock
 Tochigi S.C.  
 Thespa Kusatsu
 Tokyo Verdy  
 Yokohama F.C.
 Shonan Bellmare
 Ventforet Kofu
 Kataller Toyama 
 F.C. Gifu
 Cerezo Osaka
 Fagiano Okayama  
 Tokushima Vortis
 Ehime F.C.
 Avispa Fukuoka
 Sagan Tosu
 Roasso Kumamoto

League format 
Eighteen clubs will play in triple round-robin format, a total of 51 games each. A club receives 3 points for a win, 1 point for a tie, and 0 points for a loss. The clubs are ranked by points, and tie breakers are, in the following order: 
 Goal differential 
 Goals scored 
 Head-to-head results
 Disciplinary points
A draw would be conducted, if necessary.  However, if two clubs are tied at the first place, both clubs will be declared as the champions. The top three clubs will be promoted to J1.
Changes from Previous Year
 Eighteen participating clubs, increased by three from last year
 Number of games per club increased to 51, up from 42.
 The fourth foreign player slot (AFC player slot) is introduced
 Top three clubs now receives promotion by default; during 2004–2008 seasons, the third place club needed to win playoffs for the promotion.

Final league table

Final results

Top scorers

Attendance

References

J2 League seasons
2
Japan
Japan